This is a list of haciendas of Yucatán.

A

B
Hacienda Blanca Flor
Hacienda Bucalemu

C
Hacienda Cacao 
Hacienda Chenché de las Torres
Hacienda Chenkú 
Hacienda Chichén
Hacienda Chichí de los Lagos
Hacienda Chichí Suárez 
Hacienda Citincabchén
Hacienda Chunchucmil No separate article on the Spanish site. It is included as a section in both articles Chunchucmil (sitio arqueológico) and  Chunchucmil
Hacienda Cuca  (es)
Hacienda Chochoh (es)
Hacienda Cocoyoc

D
Hacienda Dzibikak 
Hacienda Dzoyolá

E
Hacienda Eknakán

F

G

H

I
Hacienda Itzincab Cámara has links to Lauburu There is an English page but no links to the haciendas mentioned on the Spanish page.

J
Haciendas Jardins de Merida

K
Hacienda Kancabchén
Hacienda Kancabchén (Halachó)
Hacienda Kancabchén (Homún) 
Hacienda Kancabchén (Motul) 
Hacienda Kancabchén (Tunkás)
Hacienda Kancabchén Ucí
Hacienda Kancabchén de Valencia
Hacienda Kankabchén (Seyé) 
Hacienda Kankabchén (Tixkokob)
Hacienda Katanchel 
Hacienda Kochol

L
Hacienda Lepan (es)

M
Haciendas de Michoacán
Hacienda Mozanga
Hacienda Mulchechén (es)
Hacienda Misné (es)
Hacienda Misnebalam (es)
Hacienda Mucuyché
Maxcanú Municipality:
Hacienda Ché
Hacienda Canzote
Hacienda Crucero Copop
Haciendas Memu y Xamail
Hacienda Simón
Hacienda Xlam Riti

N
Hacienda Nuestra Señora de la Soledad Pebá

O
Hacienda Oxtapacab (es)

P
Hacienda de Peñalolén
Hacienda Petcanche (es)
Hacienda Petectunich (es)
Hacienda Poxilá (es)

Q

R

S
Hacienda Sahé (es)
Hacienda Sac Chich (aka San Antonio Sac Chich) (es)
Hacienda San Antonio Chalante, there is an article on the village, makes no mention of the hacienda (es)
Hacienda San Antonio Chel  (es)
Hacienda San Antonio Cucul (es)
Hacienda San Antonio Kaua  (es)
Hacienda San Antonio Millet (es)
Hacienda San Antonio Tahdzibichén, mentioned in a subcategory of the subcommissary Tahdzibichén (Mérida) 
Hacienda San Antonio Tehuitz (es)
Hacienda San Bernardo (es)
Hacienda San Diego Azcorra (es)
Hacienda San Diego Tixcacal
Hacienda San Ildefonso Teya (aka Hacienda Teya) 
Hacienda San Ignacio (es)
Hacienda San José Chactún
Hacienda San José Chakán, (es)
Hacienda San José Cholul (es)
Hacienda de San Juan Bautista Tabi, no article, but mentions the hacienda here Oxkutzcab
Hacienda San Juan Dzonot (es)
Hacienda San Lorenzo de Aké, this appears to be on the Mayan site, but talks briefly about the hacienda and has photos Aké
Hacienda de San Mateo de la Zarca
Hacienda San Miguel, there is nothing about this place on the Spanish site. There is one that is not on this list that I will add immediately below, clearly a different place from photos and location.
Hacienda San Miguel Chac (aka Hacienda Chac) (es)
Hacienda San Nicolás Dzoyaxché (es)
Hacienda San Pedro Chimay (es)
Hacienda San Pedro Chukuaxín (es)
Hacienda San Pedro Noh Pat (aka Hacienda San Pedro Nohpat) (es)
Hacienda San Pedro Ochil (es)
Hacienda San Pedro Palomeque (es)
Hacienda de San Pedro Tenexac
Hacienda de Santa Anna Aragón
Hacienda Santa Cruz (Tixkokob) (es)
Hacienda Santa Cruz Palomeque (es)
Hacienda Santa María Acú, village (no reference to hacienda) (es)
Hacienda Santa Rosa de Lima
Hacienda Santo Domingo
Hacienda Sotuta de Peón (es)
Hacienda Suytunchén (Mérida) (es) 
Hacienda Suytunchén (Tecoh) (es)
Hacienda San Diego Cutz

T
Hacienda Tamanché (es)
Hacienda Tanil (es)
Hacienda Tanlum (es)
Hacienda Techoh (es)
Hacienda Tekit de Regil (es)
Hacienda Temozón
Hacienda Temozón Sur (es)
Hacienda Tepich another name same, I think. The one on my list says it is near Acanceh 12 km from Mérida.  Spanish wiki has a similar name also near Acanceh, but 22 km from Mérida and photos do not appear to be same architectural style? See below for the one from Spanish wiki:
Hacienda Tepich Carrillo (es)
Hacienda Thoho-Ku
Hacienda Ticopó (es)
Hacienda Ticum

U
Hacienda Uayalceh (es)
Hacienda Uayamón
Hacienda de Uluapa

V
Hacienda Xcanatún (es)

W

X
Hacienda Xcanchakán (aka Hacienda X-Kanchakán)  (es)
Hacienda Xcumpich (es)
Hacienda Xcunya, is showing in a section on the village page (es) 
Hacienda Xmatkuil
Hacienda Xtepén, is showing in a section on the village page (es)

Y
Hacienda Yaxcopoil
Hacienda Yaxnic (es)
Hacienda Yucatán Palace (Yucatán Palacio? Palacio de Yucatán?)
Hacienda Yunkú, there is a page on the village, nothing of the hacienda (es)